Qorxmazoba (also, Qorx-mazoba) is a village and municipality in the Quba district of Azerbaijan.  It has a population of 831.  The municipality consists of the villages of Qorxmazoba and Əspərəsti.

References

External links

Populated places in Quba District (Azerbaijan)